Kurdish mythology is the collective term for the beliefs and practices of the culturally, ethnically or linguistically related group of ancient peoples who inhabited the Kurdistan mountains of northwestern Zagros, northern Mesopotamia and southeastern Anatolia. This includes their Indo-European pagan religion prior to them converting to Islam or Christianity, as well the local myths, legends and folklore that they produced after becoming Muslims.

Before Islam

Origin story

In Kurdish mythology, the ancestors of the Kurds fled to the mountains to escape the oppression of a king named Zahhak. It is believed that these people, like Kaveh the Blacksmith who hid in the mountains over the course of history created a Kurdish ethnicity. Mountains, to this day, are still important geographical and symbolic figures in Kurdish life. In common with other national myths, Kurdish mythology is used for political aims.

After Islam
The Sasanian king Chosroes II Parvez  is highly esteemed in the Kurdish oral tradition, literature and mythology.

Shahmaran 
Shahmaran or (Şahmaran) is a mythical creature in Kurdish Folklore, she's believed to be a human-snake hybrid that lived in a cave, and she was considered the wisdom goddess to protect secrets, it's also believed that when shahmaran dies her spirit passes to her daughter.

See also
 Iranian mythology
 Armenian mythology
 Ossetian mythology
 Scythian mythology
 Islamic mythology

References

 
Iranian mythology
Kurdish culture
Kurdish folklore